The Smurfs (syndicated as Smurfs' Adventures) is an animated fantasy-comedy children's television series that originally aired on NBC from 12 September 1981 to 2 December 1989, lasted for eight years. Produced by Hanna-Barbera Productions, it is based on the Belgian comic series by the same name, created by Belgian cartoonist Peyo (who also served as story supervisor of this adaptation) and aired for 258 episodes with a total of 419 stories, excluding three cliffhanger episodes and seven specials.

History
In 1976, Stuart R. Ross, an American media and entertainment entrepreneur who saw the Smurfs while traveling in Belgium, entered into an agreement with Editions Dupuis and Peyo, acquiring North American and other rights to the characters, whose original name was "les Schtroumpfs". Subsequently, Ross launched the Smurfs in the United States in association with a California company, Wallace Berrie and Co., whose figurines, dolls and other Smurf merchandise became a hugely popular success. NBC President Fred Silverman's daughter, Melissa, had a Smurf doll of her own that he had bought for her at a toy shop while they were visiting Aspen, Colorado. Silverman thought that a series based on the Smurfs might make a good addition to his Saturday-morning lineup.

The Saturday morning cartoon The Smurfs, produced by Hanna-Barbera Productions in association with SEPP International S.A. (from 1981 to 1987) and Lafig S.A. (in the years 1988 and 1989), debuted on NBC at 8:30 AM in 1981. The series became a major success for the network (one of the few hits to emerge from the Fred Silverman era) and one of the most successful and longest running Saturday morning cartoons in television history, spawning seven spin-off television specials on an almost yearly basis. The characters included Papa Smurf, Smurfette, Brainy Smurf, the evil Gargamel, his cat Azrael, and Johan and his friend Peewit. The Smurfs was nominated multiple times for Daytime Emmy Awards and won Outstanding Children's Entertainment Series in 1982–1983.

By 1989, the show was in its ninth season and had reached the 200-episode threshold, an extreme rarity when most cartoons were gone after two seasons and 22 episodes (it also far exceeded the typical 65-episode run of a first-run syndicated show of the era). In an effort to come up with new ideas to keep the show fresh, NBC changed the format of the show, taking some of the Smurfs out of the forest and omitting the Smurf Village. These changes were adopted to a lost-in-time format similar to The Time Tunnel (at the same time NBC had a hit with the prime time series Quantum Leap which also dealt with time travel). The show continued through the end of the season, airing the last original episode 2 December 1989 on NBC, after a decade of success, NBC later cancelled The Smurfs along with other Saturday-morning cartoons to make way for another block of live-action programming on 9 April 1990, The Smurfs had its last re-run on NBC on 25 August 1990. The total number of individual eleven minute and twenty-two minute cartoons in the entire series run came to 425.

Episodes

Voice cast and characters

 Charlie Adler as Natural "Nat" Smurfling (1985–1988)
 Jack Angel as Enchanter Homnibus
 Marlene Aragon as additional voices (1982)
 Bob Arbogast as additional voices (1986, 1989)
 Lewis Arquette as additional voices (1987)
 René Auberjonois as additional voices (1987, 1989)
 Jered Barclay as additional voices (1982–1984, 1989)
 Ed Begley Jr. as additional voices (1984, uncredited)
 Bernard Behrens as additional voices (1984)
 Michael Bell as Grouchy Smurf, Handy Smurf, Lazy Smurf, Johan (1982–1987), Gargamel (Season 9), Additional voices
 Gregg Berger as additional voices (1987, 1989)
 Lucille Bliss as Smurfette
 Susan Blu as Nanny Smurf (1988), Pansy
 Sorrell Booke as additional voices (1988)
 Peter Brooks as additional voices (1986)
 Greg Burson as additional voices (1982)
 Ruth Buzzi as additional voices (1984, 1989)
 William Callaway as Clumsy Smurf, Painter Smurf, Additional voices
 Joey Camen as Natural Smurf (1983–1984)
 Hamilton Camp as Greedy Smurf, Harmony Smurf, Woody, Additional voices
 Roger C. Carmel as additional voices (1986)
 Victoria Carroll as additional voices (1986)
 Mary Jo Catlett as Madame Hildegarde ("Stop and Go Smurfs", 1987)
 William Christopher as Angel Smurf
 Philip L. Clarke as additional voices (1982–1984)
 Selette Cole as additional voices (1987)
 Townsend Coleman as additional voices (1989) 
 Henry Corden as Drako ("The Magic Fountain," 1982)
 Regis Cordic as additional voices (1982)
 Tandy Cronyn as additional voices (1984, uncredited)
 Peter Cullen as Zeus (1989), Additional voices (1983–1984, 1987, 1989)
 Brian Cummings as additional voices (1989)
 Jim Cummings as the Sultan of Sweets (1989)
 Keene Curtis as Lord Balthazar
 Jennifer Darling as Princess Sabina, Additional voices (1982, 1989)
 Leo De Lyon as additional voices (1986)
 Barry Dennen as additional voices (1988–1989)
 Bronwen Denton-Davis as additional voices (1986)
 Patti Deutsch as Bignose, Additional voices (1984–1986)
 Richard Dysart as additional voices (1984, uncredited)
 Walker Edmiston as additional voices (1981–1984)
 Marshall Efron as Sloppy Smurf
 Paul Eiding as additional voices (1986–1987)
 Dick Erdman as additional voices (1981–1982, 1984, 1987)
 Bernard Erhard as Timber Smurf
 June Foray as Jokey Smurf, Mother Nature, Additional voices
 Pat Fraley as Tuffy Smurf, Additional voices (1984, 1989)
 Steve Franken as additional voices (1984, uncredited)
 Teresa Ganzel as additional voices (1989)
 Linda Gary as Dame Barbara, Chlorhydris (all episodes except the special "My Smurfy Valentine")
 Dick Gautier as Wooly Smurf
 Joan Gerber as Priscilla (1983), Gowagga Puppet ("Snappy's Puppet", 1987), Additional voices (1982–1984, 1986–1987, 1989)
 Henry Gibson as additional voices (1984)
 Ed Gilbert as additional voices (1989)
 Patty Glick as additional voices (1984)
 Danny Goldman as Brainy Smurf
 Barry Gordon as the Gamemaster, Additional voices (1985)
 Joy Grdnic as additional voices (1982)
 Ernest Harada as additional voices (1984, 1989)
 Phil Hartman as additional voices (1982, 1985–1987, 1989)
 Bob Holt as the Good King (1982–1983)
 Jerry Houser as Ripple (1987), Tebuli the Genie (1989)
 John Ingle as additional voices (1987)
 Robert Ito as additional voices (1989)
 Tony Jay as Merlin (1989)
 Arte Johnson as Devil Smurf
 Marvin Kaplan as Gourdy (1986)
 Zale Kessler as additional voices (1982, 1984, 1987)
 Aron Kincaid as additional voices (1987–1988)
 Kip King as Tailor Smurf
 Paul Kirby as additional voices (1981–1982)
 Clyde Kusatsu as additional voices (1989)
 Robbie Lee as additional voices (1984, 1989)
 Ruta Lee as Evelyn (1987), Morgan le Fay (1989)
 Katie Leigh as Denisa (1988)
 Michael Lembeck as additional voices (1987–1988)
 Marilyn Lightstone as additional voices (1984)
 Keye Luke as additional voices (1989)
 Allan Lurie as additional voices (1983–1984, 1988)
 Jim MacGeorge as additional voices (1989)
 Norma MacMillan as Brenda (1983)
 Tress MacNeille as Sylvia, Additional voices (1982, 1989)
 Patty Maloney as Blue Eyes (1984)
 Danny Mann as additional voices (1982)
 Kenneth Mars as King Bullrush, Julius Geezer (1989), Additional voices (1981–1982, 1984–1986, 1988–1989)
 Mona Marshall as Weepy Smurf, Flowerbell (1982), Andria (1983)
 Amanda McBroom as Chlorhydris (the special "My Smurfy Valentine"), Additional voices (1982)
 Chuck McCann as additional voices (1989)
 Edie McClurg as additional voices (1984, uncredited)
 Cindy McGee as additional voices (1988, uncredited)
 Julie McWhirter as Baby Smurf (1983–1989), Sassette Smurfling (1985–1989)
 Joseph G. Medalis as additional voices (1984, uncredited)
 Allan Melvin as additional voices (1984–1985, 1987)
 Don Messick as Papa Smurf, Azrael, Dreamy Smurf, Chitter, Sickly Smurf (1983), Sweepy Smurf (1986), Additional voices
 Sidney Miller as additional voices (1986–1987)
 Larry Moss as additional voices (1983–1984)
 Janice Motoike as additional voices (1989)
 Pat Musick as Snappy Smurfling (1985–1989)
 Frank Nelson as Nosey Smurf, Additional voices (1982)
 Noelle North as Slouchy Smurfling (1985–1988)
 Alan Oppenheimer as Vanity Smurf, Father Time, Additional voices
 Patricia Parris as Acorn
 Rob Paulsen as Marco Smurf (1985), Additional voices (1985–1987, 1989)
 Clare Peck as additional voices (1982)
 Vic Perrin as additional voices (1984, uncredited)
 Diane Pershing as additional voices (1982, 1988)
 Patrick Pinney as additional voices (1982)
 Henry Polic II as Tracker Smurf, Additional voices (1982, 1987, 1989)
 Philip Proctor as King Gerard
 Clive Revill as additional voices (1989)
 Robert Ridgely as additional voices (1982, 1986, 1988)
 Neil Ross as additional voices (1987)
 Joe Ruskin as additional voices (1986–1987)
 Will Ryan as Slime
 Michael Rye as Morlock, Additional voices (1982, 1986)
 Robert Sarlatte as additional voices (1982)
 William Schallert as additional voices (1984, uncredited)
 Ronnie Schell as Pushover Smurf, Reporter Smurf, Jokey Smurf (early Season 1 episodes), Additional Voices (1982, 1985, 1987–1988)
 Marilyn Schreffler as additional voices (1982)
 Avery Schreiber as additional voices (1985, 1987)
 Franklin Seales as additional voices (1989)
 Susan Silo as Petaluma, Additional voices (1986, 1989)
 Hal Smith as Sludge, Additional voices (1982–1987)
 Kath Soucie as Adella ("Stop and Go Smurfs", 1987), Ali Baby (1989)
 John Stephenson as the Evil Imp and the Spirit of the Ancient Trolls ("Smurfette's Dancing Shoes", 1981), Additional voices (1981, 1984, 1987)
 Kris Stevens as additional voices (1984–1985)
 Alexandra Stoddart as additional voices (1984, 1986)
 Andre Stojka as additional voices (1987)
 Dee Stratton as additional voices (1982)
 George Takei as additional voices (1989)
 Mark Taylor as additional voices (1986)
 Russi Taylor as Smoogle (1988–1989), Brenda (1986), Additional voices (1982–1984, 1986)
 Susan Tolsky as additional voices (1987)
 Fred Travalena as additional voices (1981, 1986)
 Les Tremayne as additional voices (1987, uncredited)
 Marcelo Tubert as additional voices (1989)
 Brenda Vaccaro as Scruple (1986–1989), Architect Smurf
 Janet Waldo as Hogatha
 Ray Walston as additional voices (1986)
 Peggy Walton-Walker as additional voices (1985–1986)
 B.J. Ward as Hermes, Additional voices (1982, 1989)
 Peggy Webber as Elderberry
 Lennie Weinrib as Bigmouth
 Frank Welker as Hefty Smurf, Clockwork Smurf, Peewit (1982–1987), Poet Smurf, Puppy (1985–1988), Wild Smurf (1987–1989), Nemesis (1988), Sandman, Additional voices
 Paul Winchell as Gargamel (1981–1988), Flighty Smurf
 Jonathan Winters as Grandpa Smurf (1986–1989)
 Francine Witkin as Lady Luck ("Bad Luck Smurfs", 1987)
 Anderson Wong as additional voices (1989)
 Michael Wong as additional voices (1989)
 Alan Young as Farmer Smurf, Miner Smurf, Scaredy Smurf, Additional voices
 Lynnanne Zager as additional voices (1988, uncredited)

Production
Outsourced production work was done by Wang Film Productions/Cuckoo's Nest Studios and, only for Season 7, by Toei Animation.

Use of classical music
The Smurfs was noted for its frequent use of classical music as background music or themes for particular events. Notable works which are found in The Smurfs include:

 Isaac Albéniz, Suite española, "Asturias"
 Johann Sebastian Bach, Brandenburg Concerto No. 2, BWV 1047, Allegro moderato
 Johann Sebastian Bach, Concerto for harpsichord, strings & continuo No. 5, BWV 1056, Arioso. Largo
 Johann Sebastian Bach, Orchestral Suite No. 3, BWV 1068, Gavotte
 Ludwig van Beethoven, Piano Sonata No. 8 (Pathétique), first movement
 Ludwig van Beethoven, Piano Sonata No. 14 (Moonlight), third movement 
The above two tunes are frequently used in scenes where the Smurfs are in danger, or which otherwise have a great deal of dramatic tension.
 Ludwig van Beethoven, Piano Sonata No. 23 (Appassionata), first movement
 Ludwig van Beethoven, Symphony No. 1, first movement
 Ludwig van Beethoven, Symphony No. 6 (Pastoral), first and fourth movements
 Ludwig van Beethoven, Symphony No. 9 (Choral), second movement
 Hector Berlioz, Symphonie fantastique, second movement
 Léon Boëllmann, Suite gothique, Toccata
 Alexander Borodin, Polovtsian Dances, Fifth Dance: "Dance of the Boys" (used in dramatic moments)
 Johannes Brahms, Wiegenlied (Brahms)
 Anton Bruckner, Symphony No. 2, third movement
 Claude Debussy, Prélude à l'après-midi d'un faune
 Claude Debussy, Prelude Book 2 No. 6, Général Lavine – eccentric
 Paul Dukas, The Sorcerer's Apprentice
 Edward Elgar, Pomp and Circumstance March No. 1 ("Land of Hope and Glory")
 Edward Elgar, The Wand of Youth, Suite No. 1
 César Franck, Symphony in D minor, first and second movements
 Edvard Grieg, Peer Gynt: "Morning Mood" and "In the Hall of the Mountain King"
 "Morning Mood" is frequently heard when Mother Nature makes an appearance
 Edvard Grieg, Lyric Suite, "March of the Dwarfs"
 Albert Ketèlbey, In a Persian Market
 Lev Knipper, Cavalry of the Steppes
 Zoltán Kodály, Háry János Suite
 Franz Liszt, Hungarian Rhapsody No. 2, Friska (episode "Harmony Steals the Show")
 Franz Liszt, Piano Concerto No. 1
 Franz Liszt, Totentanz
 Franz Liszt, Transcendental étude No. 6, "Vision"
 Felix Mendelssohn, Spring Song
 Felix Mendelssohn, Wedding March (Mendelssohn) (episode "The Three Smurfketeers")
 Wolfgang Amadeus Mozart, The Magic Flute
 Wolfgang Amadeus Mozart, The Marriage of Figaro
 Wolfgang Amadeus Mozart, Symphony No. 35 in D major, K.385 "Haffner", 4th movement, "The Smurflings" episode (just a very slowed down version)
 Wolfgang Amadeus Mozart, Symphony No. 40 in G minor, K.550, 1st movement, (episode "The Haunted Smurfs")
 Modest Mussorgsky, Pictures at an Exhibition: Gnomus, Tuileries, Gargamel's theme variation about 1.5 minutes in, and a scene segue part about 10 minutes in, are used in the cartoon.
 Modest Mussorgsky, Night on the Bare Mountain
 Sergey Prokofiev, Symphony No. 1 ("Classical"): Gavotta
 Sergey Prokofiev, Romeo and Juliet
 Sergey Prokofiev, Peter and the Wolf
 Sergey Prokofiev, Lieutenant Kijé
 Sergey Prokofiev, Scythian Suite
 Sergei Rachmaninov, Prelude in G minor
 Maurice Ravel, Gaspard de la nuit: Le gibet
 Nikolai Rimsky-Korsakov, Scheherazade (introducing theme for Gargamel)
 Nikolai Rimsky-Korsakov, The Snow Maiden: Dance of the Tumblers
 Nikolai Rimsky-Korsakov, The Golden Cockerel
 Nikolai Rimsky-Korsakov, Flight of the Bumblebee
 Gioachino Rossini, William Tell Overture
 Camille Saint-Saëns, Symphony No. 3 ("Organ"), first movement
 Franz Schubert: Rosamunde: Ballet Music No. 2
 Franz Schubert: Serenade
 Franz Schubert, Symphony No. 8 ("Unfinished"), first movement, used as Gargamel's theme and used in scenes when the Smurfs are in danger
 Jean Sibelius, Finlandia
 Richard Strauss, Till Eulenspiegels lustige Streiche
 Igor Stravinsky, The Firebird
 Igor Stravinsky, The Rite of Spring
 Igor Stravinsky, Petrushka: Russian Dance
 Pyotr Ilyich Tchaikovsky, Natha Waltz
 Pyotr Ilyich Tchaikovsky, Russian Dance
 Pyotr Ilyich Tchaikovsky, The Nutcracker
 Pyotr Ilyich Tchaikovsky, The Nutcracker, Reed Flutes (episode "How To Smurf A Rainbow")
 Pyotr Ilyich Tchaikovsky, The Seasons: June, August
 Pyotr Ilyich Tchaikovsky, Swan Lake
 Pyotr Ilyich Tchaikovsky, Symphony No. 4: Finale (Allegro con fuoco)
 Pyotr Ilyich Tchaikovsky, Symphony No. 6 ("Pathétique"), second theme from first movement
 Pyotr Ilyich Tchaikovsky, Romeo and Juliet Fantasy Overture (used in scenes of love)
 Richard Wagner, Die Meistersinger von Nürnberg Overture
 Richard Wagner, The Ring

Syndication
A half-hour version for syndication was broadcast under the title Smurfs' Adventures since 1986. Although each season had its own unique opening song during the original broadcast, syndicated airings usually use a shortened version of the season 4 opening, currently, the syndicated versions continued to air on Boomerang.

Home media

Region 1
Warner Home Video (via Hanna-Barbera Cartoons and Warner Bros. Family Entertainment) released the complete first season on DVD in a two-volume set in 2008.  Despite high sales of both sets, no further seasons have been released. Warner Home Video later released a series of three single-disc releases of The Smurfs in 2009, each containing five episodes from the second season. A two-disc DVD was set to be released in 2011 to tie into the theatrical film with 10 episodes which would be culled from the entire run of the series, instead, it included episodes from the second season. Another DVD with both Smurfs Christmas specials was released later that year. It is unknown if Warner Archive will release the rest of the show's complete seasons (under the Hanna-Barbera Classics Collection banner or not) on MOD DVD.

In 2020, HBO Max released seasons one to four on its online streaming platform. The available seasons are presented in 1080p high definition.

Region 2
Fabulous Films and Arrow Films have released the first five seasons on DVD in the UK.
The company has also released the film The Smurfs and the Magic Flute on Blu-ray and DVD, as well as several compilation DVDs, containing themed specials from the show.

Sony Pictures Home Entertainment has announced the release of the full Series in 9 Season Sets on DVD in Germany, with German sound only, beginning in August 2011.

Region 4
Magna Home Entertainment has released various best-of volume collections on DVD.

The Smurfs and the Magic Flute has been released, but in a new 'Original Collector's Edition' with new packaging released on 2 September 2011.
The Smurfs – Time Travellers (3 Disc Set) was released on 5 November 2008.
The Smurfs – Smurfette Collection (3 Disc Set) was released on 1 September 2009.
The Smurfs – Papa Smurf Collection (3 Disc Set) was released on 4 November 2009.
The Smurfs – Favourites Collection (6 Disc Box Set) was released on 29 June 2010.
The Smurfs – Just Smurfy 1 (Box Set) (BONUS Figurine) was released on 3 November 2010.
The Smurfs – Just Smurfy 2 (Box Set) (BONUS Figurine) was released on 3 November 2010.
The Smurfs – Just Smurfy 3 (Box Set) (BONUS Figurine) was released on 1 December 2010.
The Smurfs – Just Smurfy 4 (Box Set) (BONUS Figurine) was released on 2 March 2011.
The Smurfs – Complete Season 1 (3 Disc Digipak) and The Smurfs – Complete Season 2 (3 Disc Digipak) were released on 24 August 2011.
The Smurfs – Complete Season 3 (4 Disc Digipak) and The Smurfs – Complete Season 4 (4 Disc Digipak) were released on 5 October 2011.
The Smurfs – Complete Season 5 (3 Disc Digipak) was released on 1 December 2011.
The Smurfs – Complete Season 6 (5 Disc Digipak) was released on 4 January 2012.
The Smurfs – Complete Season 7 (5 Disc Digipak), The Smurfs – Complete Season 8 (2 Disc Digipak) were released on 1 August 2013.
The Smurfs – Complete Season 9 (3 Disc Digipak) was released on 14 August 2013.
The Smurfs – Ultimate Collection 1: Limited Edition – Seasons 1–5 (18 Disc Box Set) released on 24 August 2011.
The Smurfs – Ultimate Collection 2: Limited Edition – Seasons 6–9 (16 Disc Box Set) released on 2 November 2011.

In popular culture
 The animated versions of Papa Smurf and Brainy Smurf were featured in Cartoon All-Stars to the Rescue. Hefty Smurf also makes a brief cameo in the beginning of the movie with the other Smurfs, his only line being, "Who smurfed the bell?" Smurfette is shown on the promotional poster and VHS cover artwork, but was not seen in the special. Harmony Smurf made a small cameo as the Smurfs comic book was flipping through pages.
 Gargamel and Azrael made guest appearances on Family Guy in 2009.
 The Smurfs were often parodied in Robot Chicken where Danny Goldman reprises his role of Brainy Smurf, while Dan Milano voiced Papa Smurf and Seth Green voiced Gargamel.
 In the Harvey Birdman, Attorney at Law episode "Guitar Control", a tank can be seen destroying a Smurf house.

2021 reboot
In 2017, the Belgian companies IMPS and Dupuis Audiovisuel began production on an updated Smurfs series with CG animation, similar to Smurfs: The Lost Village. The series made its world premiere, on RTBF's OUFtivi channel in Belgium, on 18 April 2021. It premiered on Nick & Nicktoons in September 2021 in the U.S

See also
List of works produced by Hanna-Barbera Productions
List of Hanna-Barbera characters

Notes

References

External links

 The Smurfs at Big Cartoon DataBase
 

1981 American television series debuts
1989 American television series endings
1980s American animated television series
1980s American children's comedy television series
American children's animated comedy television series
American children's animated adventure television series
American children's animated fantasy television series
English-language television shows
The Funtastic World of Hanna-Barbera
Television about magic
NBC original programming
Television series based on Belgian comics
Television series by Hanna-Barbera
Television series set in the Middle Ages
TV
Wizards in television

ro:Smurfii